Emptiness is a 2020 Ecuadorian drama film directed by Paul Venegas. It was selected as the Ecuadorian entry for the Best International Feature Film at the 93rd Academy Awards, but it was not nominated.

Synopsis
Two Chinese immigrants newly arrived in Ecuador find themselves under the thumb of an obsessive gangster.

See also
 List of submissions to the 93rd Academy Awards for Best International Feature Film
 List of Ecuadorian submissions for the Academy Award for Best International Feature Film

References

External links
 

2020 films
2020 drama films
Ecuadorian drama films
2020s Spanish-language films